Ellis E. Cousens (born 1952) is Executive Vice President, Chief Financial Officer and Chief Operations Officer of John Wiley & Sons, Inc., since March 2001. Previously Senior Vice President, Chief Financial Officer of Bookspan, a Bertelsmann AG and Time Warner Inc. joint venture, from March 2000; Vice President, Finance and Strategic Planning, of Bertelsmann AG from March 1999; Vice President, Chief Financial Officer of BOL.com, a subsidiary of Bertelsmann AG, from August 1998.

Education 
Cousens graduated from DeWitt Clinton High School, Bronx, NY class of 1970. He earned a bachelor's degree from Hunter College, Master of Science from Rensselaer Polytechnic Institute and an MBA in Finance from the Hagan School of Business of Iona College.

External links 
 Key Executives of John Wiley & Sons, Inc.

1952 births
Living people
Rensselaer Polytechnic Institute alumni
Iona University alumni
Hunter College alumni
American chief operating officers
American chief financial officers